James Tannock (1784–1863) was a Scottish portrait painter.

Life
The son of a shoemaker, he was born in Kilmarnock. He was apprenticed to his father but became a house-painter.

A painter of portraits as a hobby, Tannock had some instruction from Alexander Nasmyth. After that he practised successfully as a portrait painter in Glasgow and Greenock, also producing miniatures. In 1810 he came to London and established himself in Newman Street, contributing some 44 portraits to the Royal Academy exhibitions between 1813 and 1841.

Tannock died in London on 6 May 1863.

Works

Tannock's portraits of George Chalmers, George Joseph Bell, and Henry Bell went to the Scottish National Portrait Gallery.

Family
His younger brother, William Tannock, also practised as a portrait-painter, and exhibited works between 1820 and 1830, including of Reverend George Smith.

Notes

External links

Attribution

1784 births
1863 deaths
19th-century Scottish painters
Scottish male painters
Scottish portrait painters
People from Kilmarnock
19th-century Scottish male artists